The Victoria Stakes is a thoroughbred horse race run annually at Woodbine Racetrack in Toronto, Ontario, Canada. Held in mid June, it has been raced on Polytrack since 2006 over a distance of five furlongs. In 2015 it was changed to six furlongs. Open to two-year-old horses, it currently offers a purse of $96,363.

Named in honor of Queen Victoria who had died in 1901, the Victoria Stakes was first run in 1903 at the Old Woodbine Racetrack. Following that facility's closure, the race was moved in 1956 to the new Woodbine race track. For 1979 only, it was raced on turf.

Since inception, the  Victoria Stakes has been competed over various distances: 
 5 furlongs : 1903-1955
  furlongs : 1956-1978
 About 5 furlongs : 1979
 1980 to 2014 : 5 furlongs
 2015 : 6 furlongs

Historical notes

A number of notable North American horses have won this race including George Smith who won the next year's Kentucky Derby, Belair Stud's colt  Faireno in 1931 who was the first horse to break the one-minute barrier and who went on to win the 1932 Belmont Stakes. Notable Canadian-bred winners include Windfields (1945), Nearctic, (1956), Viceregal (1968), and Deputy Minister who in 1981 set a new race record for five furlongs that still stands. In 1982, Sunny's Halo finished second but the following year became only the second Canadian-bred horse to win the Kentucky Derby.

Records
Time record: (at the present distance of 5 furlongs)
 0:57.20 - Deputy Minister (1981)

Most wins by an owner:
 5 - Stafford Farms (1960, 1961, 1974, 1975, 1976)

Most wins by a jockey:
 4 - Avelino Gomez (1956, 1960, 1966, 1967)
 5 - David Clark (1982, 1988, 2003, 2005, 2011)

Most wins by a trainer:
 4 - Gil Rowntree (1974, 1975, 1976, 1985)

Winners

 * In 2003, Gemini Dream won but was disqualified and placed last for interference.
 † Run in two divisions in 1995.

References
 The Victoria Stakes at Pedigree Query

Ungraded stakes races in Canada
Flat horse races for two-year-olds
Recurring sporting events established in 1903
Woodbine Racetrack